The Ronchetti Cup (called till 1996 European Cup Liliana Ronchetti) was an annual women’s basketball European club competition held by FIBA between the years 1972 and 2002. It was the second competition in European basketball, after the European Cup For Women’s Champions Clubs (later renamed EuroLeague Women).

It was replaced in 2002 by the EuroCup Women which is the absolute equivalent.

History

Liliana Ronchetti and European basketball
Liliana Ronchetti started playing basketball in Como, Italy at the age of 20. Ronchetti, or Lily as she was called by her team mates, won 4 consecutive national titles with Como in the 1950s and played 83 games for the Italian national team.

One year after she quit basketball Lily died of cancer. Her name has persisted through the European Cup Liliana Ronchetti (renamed in 1996 more simply Ronchetti Cup). This competition was created by FIBA in 1974 as the second European competition for women’s clubs.

Ronchetti Cup winners

External links
 History of Ronchetti Cup
 Official statistics

 
Defunct women's basketball cup competitions in Europe
International club basketball competitions